Fenimore Chatterton (July 21, 1860May 9, 1958) was an American businessman, politician, and lawyer. He was the sixth Governor of Wyoming from April 28, 1903 until January 2, 1905.

Biography
Chatterton was born in Oswego County, New York, but raised in Washington, D.C.  He attended the George Washington University, then Millersville State Normal School in Lancaster, Pennsylvania. In 1878, he moved to Sheridan, in Wyoming Territory, and set up as a businessman. He received a law degree from the University of Michigan in 1892. Chatterton married Stella Wyland Chatterton.

Career
In 1888, he began his political career by successfully running for treasurer and probate judge of Carbon County. He served time in two classes of the Wyoming State Legislature from 1890 until 1893. He was the Wyoming Republican state chair from 1893 to 1894.

In 1898, he was elected Secretary of State, but his tenure was interrupted by the death of Governor DeForest Richards in 1903, thrusting him into the position of governor. Chatterdon served as governor from April 28, 1903 to January 2, 1905. It was during Chatterton's time as Governor that the hanging of Tom Horn occurred; it has been speculated that Chatterton's failure to win re-election as governor in 1905 was the result of his refusal to commute Horn's death sentence. Chatterdon was not nominated by his party to fill the office of governor for the 1904 election,  but continued to serve as Secretary of State until his term expired in 1907.

After his term as Secretary of State expired, Chatterton did not serve in public office again. He set up a private law practice, from which he retired in 1932.

Death and legacy
Chatterton died on May 9, 1958, and is interred at Lakeview Cemetery in Cheyenne, Wyoming. He was an Episcopalian and a member of the Knights Templar Masonic Order.

Chatterton has been credited as the first to announce the Wyoming (song)  as the official state song, during the Industrial Convention in 1903. The song was later endorsed as the official song by the state press association, state industrial convention and the state university.

References

External links
  
 
 from the National Governors Association
State biography from the Wyoming State Archives
Biographical summary from the Political Graveyard
North Platte River from Wyoming Tales and Trails

Roster of State Officers from the Wyoming Secretary of State website
 Wyoming Roundup

1860 births
1958 deaths
People from Oswego County, New York
Republican Party Wyoming state senators
Secretaries of State of Wyoming
Republican Party governors of Wyoming
University of Michigan Law School alumni
People from Carbon County, Wyoming
George Washington University alumni
People from Sheridan, Wyoming